Alem Marr (June 18, 1787March 29, 1843) was a Jacksonian member of the United States House of Representatives from Pennsylvania.

Marr was born in Upper Mount Bethel Township, Pennsylvania. In 1795 he and his family relocated near Milton, Pennsylvania. He graduated from Princeton College in 1807, studied law, was admitted to the bar in 1813 and commenced practice in Danville, Pennsylvania.

Marr was elected as a Jacksonian to the Twenty-first Congress. He was not a candidate for renomination in 1830 and retired to his farm near Milton where he died; his remains were interred in Milton Cemetery.

Sources

The Political Graveyard

1787 births
1843 deaths
People from Northumberland County, Pennsylvania
People from Danville, Pennsylvania
Princeton University alumni
Jacksonian members of the United States House of Representatives from Pennsylvania
Burials in Pennsylvania
19th-century American politicians